Zamora is a toponymic surname referring to the city of Zamora, Spain.

People with the name

Arts and entertainment
Antonio de Zamora (1660–1727), Spanish playwright
Cynthia Zamora (born 1938), Filipino actress 
Gwen Zamora (born 1990), Filipina-Italian actress, model, and dancer
Javier Zamora, Salvadoran-American poet and activist
Ramon Zamora (1935–2007), Filipino actor and martial artist
Tico Zamora (born 1967), American rock musician
Tye Zamora (born 1977), American musician
Vanessa Zamora (born 1991), Mexican singer-songwriter
Zamora the Torture King (born 1963), American circus performer
Zamora (pianist) (born 1979), Venezuelan musician

Journalism
José Rubén Zamora (born 1956), Guatemalan journalist
Marcela Zamora, (born 1980), Salvadoran-Nicaraguan documentary director and journalist

Politics
 Francis Zamora (born 1977), Filipino politician, businessman, and basketball player
 Jesús Jiménez Zamora (1823–1897), Costa Rican president
 Manuel E. Zamora (born 1950), Filipino politician
 Martha Lucía Zamora (born 1960), Colombian lawyer and politician
 Mery Zamora (born 1972), Ecuadorian teacher, politician, and union leader
 Niceto Alcalá-Zamora (1877–1949), Spanish president
 Ronaldo Zamora (born 1944), Filipino lawyer and politician
 Rubén Zamora (born 1942), Salvadoran politician
 Víctor Hugo Zamora (born 1970), Bolivian politician
 Xavier Espot Zamora (born 1979), Andorran politician and current prime minister of Andorra

Religion
Jacinto Zamora (1835–1872) Filipino secular priest
Nicolás Zamora (1875–1914), Filipino Methodist minister

Sport

Association football
Alejandro Zamora (born 1984), Spanish footballer
Bobby Zamora (born 1981), English footballer
Jairon Zamora (born 1978), Ecuadorean footballer
Jesús María Zamora (born 1955), Spanish footballer
José Zamora (born 1988), Spanish footballer
Julio Zamora (born 1966), Argentine footballer and manager
Ricardo Zamora (1901–1978), Spanish footballer
Steven Zamora (born 1989), Ecuadorian footballer

Other sports
Alfonso Zamora (born 1954), Mexican Olympic boxer
Andrés Zamora (born 1983), Uruguayan Olympic long distance runner
Brittney Zamora (born 1999), American stock car racer
Daniel Zamora (born 1993), American baseball player

Other people
Antonio Zamora (born 1942), author of books on the Carolina Bays
Diane Zamora (born 1978), American murderer
Ezequiel Zamora (1817–1860), Venezuelan military commander
José Ángel Zamora López, Spanish antiquity historian
Lonnie Zamora (1933–2009), English-American police officer
Manuel B. Zamora, Jr. (born 1942), businessman, founder of Nickel Asia Corporation
Manuel A. Zamora (1870–1929), Filipino chemist and pharmacist
Pedro Zamora (1972–1994), Cuban–American AIDS activist
Pedro Zamora Álvarez (1964–2007), Guatemalan trade unionist

See also
 Zamora (disambiguation)

References

Spanish-language surnames
Spanish toponymic surnames